Xenon dichloride (XeCl2) is a xenon compound and the only known stable chloride of xenon. The compound can be prepared by using microwave discharges towards the mixture of xenon and chlorine, and it can be isolated from a condensate trap. One experiment tried to use xenon, chlorine and boron trichloride to produce XeCl2·BCl3, but only generated xenon dichloride.

However, it is still doubtful whether xenon dichloride is a true compound or a Van der Waals molecule composed of a xenon atom and a chlorine molecule connected by a secondary bond.

References

Xenon(II) compounds
Chlorides
Nonmetal halides
Van der Waals molecules